SaltCON is the largest Board Game Convention in Utah held annually in Layton at the Davis Conference Center with the "aim of bringing people together with games." The event is family friendly, and focuses on hobby and designer board games. Unlike many other conventions, the board game halls are open 24 hours for attendees to play all night long.  The event continues to grow in popularity, in large part due to its friendly atmosphere, and volunteer nature.  The event had over 1100 attendees in 2016, and continues to grow every year. In 2019 they had over 1900 attendees.

Events
SaltCON hosts the Ion Award game design competition, the largest board game design competition in the United States. Each year Publishers are asked to judge the competition, based on specific criteria. Notes are collected from judges, tallied, and winners are announced in each category. Games that win the Ion Award are published by game companies every year.  Notable winners include Nika, Hold Your Breathe, and Pizza Theory.

Along with the Ion Award competition there are other draws for game designers as well.  There are events where game designers can show off their games that are still in development, such as a "Prototype Alley" where attendees are invited to meet the designers and try out these new games.

The events are not only for game designers.  Attendees can find many other events to enjoy at the convention:
Board Game Library (over 1000 games)  
Board Game Publisher Exhibitors 
Tournaments 
Flea market
Math trade
Prizes
Play-to-win
Party games
Card games
Dexterity games
War games
Miniature games
RPGs
Figure Painting
Panel discussions
Artemis

The event has also featured charities, such as the Extra Life organization.

Occasionally there are a few video games featured at the event.

History

The convention began in 2009, as a follow up to the Gathering of Strangers board game days that were held at the University of Utah.  The first few years were held also at the U of U campus Officer's Club, but as attendance grew, they moved to the Royal Garden Inn, then to the Sheraton, and finally to the Davis Conference Center, where it has been held since 2014.

Support for Other Events
SaltCON supports other events and conventions all over Utah.  They provide their game library, volunteers, and game teachers to many other events.

Events that SaltCON has supported:
 Salt Lake Comic Con
 FanX
 Salt Lake Gaming Con
 BryceCON
 STGCON
 ICON
 International Games Day @ your Library
 International Tabletop Day
 Salt Lake Quarterly Game Day

References

Utah culture
2009 establishments in Utah